This is a list of the National Register of Historic Places listings in Hale County, Texas.

This is intended to be a complete list of properties and districts listed on the National Register of Historic Places in Hale County, Texas. There are one National Historic Landmark and one district listed on the National Register in the county. The district includes one Recorded Texas Historic Landmark.

Current listings

The publicly disclosed locations of National Register properties and districts may be seen in a mapping service provided.

|}

See also

National Register of Historic Places listings in Texas
Recorded Texas Historic Landmarks in Hale County

References

External links

Hale County, Texas
Hale County
Buildings and structures in Hale County, Texas